The University of Valladolid is a public university located in the city of Valladolid, Valladolid province, autonomous region of Castile and Leon, Spain. Established in the 13th century, it is one of the oldest universities in the world. The university has 26,000 undergraduate students and more than 2,300 professors.

History
The University of Valladolid (UVa) is a Spanish public university founded in 1241 as removal of studies at the University of Palencia, founded  by Alfonso VIII of Castile, between 1208 and 1212. It is responsible for teaching higher education in seven campuses distributed through four cities of Castile and Leon: Valladolid, Palencia, Soria and Segovia.

Buildings

The first building of the university that is notable for its architecture is the one constructed at the end of the 15th century, after the move of the institution from the Colegiata. It consists of a four sided cloister, which opens up the hallways, and a late Gothic chapel. At the cloister one enters through a portal, also late Gothic, that opens to the Bookshop Street. At the beginning of the 18th century, this became insufficient, prompting an enlargement consisting of a quadrangular cloister with four galleries that open to hallways built at the same time.

From the Plaza de Santa María (today the University Square), one can see the Baroque facade designed by the Carmelite Fray Pedro de la Visitación and constructed in 1715. There are sculptural groups that represent allegories of the subjects that are taught in the building. The central section, organized into four columns of giants, is finished off by a giant ornamental comb.

In 1909, and with great controversy, it was decided to destroy the old building, including the entrance hall from the 15th century that opened to Bookshop Street, in order to construct a new building following a design by the architect Teodosio Torres. The Baroque facade was kept.

Torres's design featured two cloisters. A staircase was situated between both cloisters and a great vestibule opened to Bookshop Street. The facade of the university building to this street was based on a reinterpretation of the Baroque facade of Fray Pedro, with a mixture of Plateresque, Baroque and Neoclassical decorative elements. At one side of the facade was an observation tower and on the other was a new clock tower that filled the corner between the University Sq. and Bookshop St.

The project experienced problems as the Baroque facade was incorporated slowly. In 1939, the building suffered a fire. To alleviate the problem of the facade's integration into Torres's building, Constantino Candeira designed a great staircase and vestibule, in the historicist style, that was accessed through the Baroque facade. The staircase is an example of the triumphalist and historicist architecture of Postwar Spain.

In 1968 the building was finished with the destruction of the second cloister and the construction of a five-floor building to house students, and the destruction of Torres's building which had been built for far fewer students. In this same reform, the observation tower and the great auditorium of 1909. The facade that faces Librería was remodeled, losing the vestigial historicism of Torres. The new auditorium flanks the facade of Fray Pedro on one of its sides.

The computer science department has hosted programming contests for the Association for Computing Machinery using online judging of the submitted programs.

Culture
Within the university there are cultural associations for music and theatre.

The youth symphonic orchestra: the Joven Orquesta de la Universidad de Valladolid (Youth Orchestra of the University of Valladolid, JOUVa) is run by students of the university, and headquartered in the Residencia Universitaria Alfonso VIII of Valladolid. Since its founding in 1998 Francisco Lara Tejero has been the artistic musical director.

The choir, the Coro de la Universidad de Valladolid (Choir of the University of Valladolid), is directed by Marcos Castán and the Early Music Group El Parnasso.

The theatre group is Gente de Teatro de la Uva, founded in 1984 with the name of People's Theatre of the Faculty of Medicine, that from 1998 became the official theater group of the university. Its director is Carlos Burguillo.

Through the Area of Extension and Culture, the university presents cultural programs throughout the year, with special emphasis on the UniversiJazz Festival and Santa Cruz.

Valladolid University supports cultural initiatives such as those developed by the Hermandad Universitaria del Santo Cristo de la Luz'', which includes Christmas and Auto Passion. It assists in the concerts that are organized through each Vice President for University Association and with public and private partnerships.

Library 
The  university library has 14 library services : they are located in Palencia, Soria and Segovia provinces, the rest are situated in Valladolid, each of them have a director. All the services are managed by a Chief Librarian and coordinated by Central Services.
The book collection is available through the Almena Catalogue and UVaDoc repository.

The collection has 970,000 books, some of which are important ; for example its ancient book collection has 45,000 titles including manuscripts and incunabulum of 10th century. Periodicals: 16,000 titles, E-journals: 21,000 titles, E-books: 900, Data bases: 66. , Theses and Masters projects: 33,000. 
Library Services : Website, reading room, interlibrary and intercampus loan, loan (book collection), computers, e-books, bibliographic information, user education online through Moodle, subject guides, and tutorials.

The library is a member of OCLC, Europe Direct, REBIUN, Dialnet, Catálogo 17, ABBA, Documat, REDINED y BUCLE.

See also 

 List of oldest universities in continuous operation
 List of medieval universities

References

External links

  
 International Relations Office
 Technical High School of Computer Engineer
 Web of the University Young Orchestra of Valladolid (JOUVa) 
 Choir of the University of Valladolid 
Scholars and Literati at the University of Valladolid (1280–1800), in Repertorium Eruditorum Totius Europae/RETE.

Valladolid
University of Valladolid
1346 establishments in Europe
14th-century establishments in Castile
Universities and colleges in Spain